Natalie A. Braswell is an American lawyer and public servant who served as Connecticut State Comptroller, one of the state's six constitutional officers and its chief fiscal guardian. Braswell was Connecticut's first African-American comptroller. She was appointed to fill the year-long unexpired term of Kevin Lembo.

Life and career 
Braswell attended the University of Connecticut, from which she received a BA in political science in 2000, an MPA in public administration in 2002, and a JD in 2007. She has taught legal practice as an adjunct professor at UConn School of Law and served on the school's foundation board and its diversity, equity, and belonging committee. She served as vice president of the George W. Crawford Black Bar Association from 2007 to 2011. She is a member of the Connecticut Bar Association.

Braswell began her career working as an associate attorney with the law office of Updike, Kelly & Spacey in Hartford from 2007 to 2011. From 2011 to 2021, she worked as general counsel and assistant comptroller under Kevin Lembo. Her duties included managing all legal affairs for the Office of the State Comptroller, negotiating and preparing contracts, overseeing procurement processes, and serving as the office's ethics liaison. Starting in March 2021, Braswell became chief of legal, planning and regulatory affairs at the Connecticut Department of Energy and Environmental Protection. She is a Democrat.

Governor Ned Lamont appointed Braswell to be comptroller effective December 31, 2021, after Kevin Lembo resigned due to ill health. Following the example of Governor William A. O'Neill, Lamont appointed Braswell as a caretaker after she committed not to seek a full four-year term. She served until the next comptroller, Sean Scanlon, assumed office on January 3, 2023.

Braswell lives with her husband, Robert, and daughter, Gabby, in Bloomfield, Connecticut.

References 

21st-century African-American politicians
21st-century American politicians
American civil servants
Connecticut Comptrollers
Connecticut Democrats
Connecticut lawyers
Living people
University of Connecticut School of Law alumni
Year of birth missing (living people)